Glossostipula is a genus of flowering plants in the family Rubiaceae. The genus is found in Mexico, Guatemala, and Honduras.

Species
Glossostipula blepharophylla 
Glossostipula concinna 
Glossostipula strigosa

References

Rubiaceae genera
Cordiereae